Huolu or Huailu is a town and the seat of Luquan District of Shijiazhuang in the eastern foothills of the Taihang Mountains in southwestern Hebei province, China, it has 12 residential communities and 27 villages under its administration.

See also
List of township-level divisions of Hebei

References

Township-level divisions of Hebei